The Kawasaki Ki-48 (shortened to 'Soukei', Army Type 99 Twin-engined Light Bomber), was a Japanese twin-engine light bomber that was used during World War II. Its Allied reporting name was "Lily".

Design and development
The development of the aircraft began at the end of 1937 at the request of the Japanese military high command. Kawasaki received an order to develop a "high-speed bomber" capable of 480 km/h (300 mph) at 3,000 m (9,840 ft), and able to reach 5,000 m (16,400 ft) within 10 minutes. It was inspired by the Soviet Tupolev SB.

Kawasaki had the advantage of the experience of designing the Ki-45 twin-engined heavy fighter. Most technical problems were solved; however the aircraft had a number of shortcomings. It carried only an 800 kg (1,760 lb) bombload. This was actually more than contemporary light bombers such as the Bristol Blenheim or Tupolev SB, and only slightly less than light bombers designed several years later, such as the A-20 Havoc, and the strikingly similar-appearing Martin Maryland and Baltimore. Speed was intended to be its primary defense, much like the later, unarmed, de Havilland Mosquito. So it had only three machine guns (again, an equivalent armament to contemporary light bombers). This made it very vulnerable to enemy fighters later in the war, once they became fast enough to actually catch it. The flight characteristics of the Ki-48 also left much to be desired. Newer generations of Allied fighters caught up in speed, and eventually, the Ki-48 was too slow to outrun them, while superior modern Japanese aircraft, such as the Yokosuka P1Y and the Mitsubishi Ki-67, could only be produced in small numbers. The first versions were lightly armoured, so the Ki-48 was quite aerobatic, and could loop and turn with an experienced pilot at the controls. The aircraft was often used as a dive bomber in Burma. The aircraft was not necessarily a failure, and was considered an acceptable light bomber for the first few years of the war by many historians. Much like the Mitsubishi A6M Zero fighter, it was satisfactory for the period when it was designed and produced, but had to be used against much newer and faster competition, due to Japan's inability to produce enough newer aircraft.

Operational history

The aircraft served in China from late 1940, replacing the Kawasaki Ki-32, and were widely used in the Philippines, Malaya, Burma, New Guinea, the Solomon Islands and the Dutch East Indies, where the Ki-48 Ia and Ib models, slow and badly armed, were supplemented by the marginally improved Ki-48 IIa and IIc, which were maintained in service along with the older types until the end of the war.

All models continued in service until the Battle of Okinawa during April 1945, when many were converted into kamikaze aircraft (Ki-48-II KAI Tai-Atari) armed with an 800 kg (1,760 lb) bomb. Some aircraft were modified to act as testbeds; one carried the Kawasaki Ki-148 guided missile intended for use on the Kawasaki Ki-102 in late 1944, and one was modified to test a Ne-0 pulsejet engine in late 1944 to early 1945.

The fact that all models continued in service until 1945 reflects that many Ki-48s survived more often than not. This was due to the use of small ship formations (three to ten aircraft) escorted by large numbers of fighters (25–75), typically Nakajima Ki-43s.  Although not as fast as more modern fighters, after 1942, the aircraft was still fast enough to enable it to often avoid interception unless it ran into a standing patrol of fighters. The 90th Air Regiment of the 5th Air Army (based in Hopei, north China) equipped with Ki-48s was the only Japanese air unit in China proper to engage the Soviets, although others were advanced in preparation. It flew 20 sorties against the Soviets during 14 August 1945.

Ki-48 Special Attack Unit
The British Pacific Fleet departed from Ceylon on 16 January 1945 en route to Australia, and struck Japanese-held oil wells and refineries at Palembang, Sumatra on 24–29 January 1945 in Operation Meridian.

On 29 January, seven Kawasaki Ki-48 of the Army's Shichisi Mitate Tokubetsu Kōgeki Tai counter-attacked the Allied fleet at low level as the British aircraft were returning from Palembang. The British radar picture was confused by the presence of over 100 friendly aircraft and the first two or three Supermarine Seafire CAP interceptions did not occur until just before the Ki-48 formation entered the air defence zone. The last pair of Seafires chased the five remaining Ki-48s inside the screen, and with the support of returning Vought F4U Corsairs and Grumman F6F Hellcats which had just been scrambled, shot down all of them, amongst intense AA fire. One Seafire was slightly damaged and one Hellcat was written off due to friendly fire, but the only ship to be damaged was the carrier , hit by heavy AA shells.

Such success, minor by Pacific fighting standards at the time, gave the British Pacific Fleet useful expertise and confidence in its ability to deal with kamikaze attacks.

Variants
 Ki-48
Four prototypes with  Nakajima Ha25 engines and five pre-production aircraft, with modified tail surfaces.
 Ki-48-Ia
Army Type 99 Twin Engine Light Bomber Model 1A; as first series model. Produced from 1940, 557 built.
 Ki-48-Ib,
Similar to the Ia, with changes in defensive machine gun mountings.
Total production of Ki-48 Ia and Ib: 557 aircraft
 Ki-48-II
Three prototypes built.
 Ki-48-IIa
Fitted with more powerful engines, a longer fuselage, additional armour, and larger bomb load. Produced from April 1942.
 Ki-48-IIb
Dive bomber version, with reinforced fuselage and dive brakes.
 Ki-48-IIc
Improved defensive weapons. Produced from 1943.
 Total production of Ki-48 IIa, IIb and IIc: 1,408 aircraft
 Ki-48-II KAI Kamikaze (Type Tai-Atari)
Conversion with 800 kg (1,760 lb) of explosives and two or three crew for kamikaze missions
 Ki-66
Nose turret removed and replaced with solid nose fitted with 2x fixed forward firing 12.7mm machine guns. 8 prototypes built of varying configurations. None selected for mass production due to minimal increase in speed. Dive brakes used on Ki-48 IIb.
 Ki-81
Proposed version of the Ki-48. Not built.
 Ki-174
Single-seat special attack version. Not built.

 Total production of all versions: 1,997 aircraft

Operators

Imperial Japanese Army Air Force
 3rd Attack Air Combat Regiment (June 1942 – June 1945)
 6th Attack Air Combat Regiment (1942–1945)
 8th Light Bomber Air Combat Regiment (August 1941 – 1945)
 12th Light Bomber Air Combat Regiment (April 1944 – August 1945)
 16th Light Bomber Air Combat Regiment (1941–1945)
 34th Light Bomber Air Combat Regiment (October 1942 – April 1944)
 35th Light Bomber Air Combat Regiment (1942–1944)
 45th Attack Air Combat Regiment (July 1940 – February 1944)
 65th Attack/Light Bomber Air Combat Regiment (1940 – July 1941)
 75th Attack Air Combat Regiment (1941 – April 1945)
 90th Light Bomber Air Combat Regiment (October 1941 – August 1945)
 206th Light Bomber Air Combat Regiment (June 1941 – July 1941)
 208th Light Bomber Air Combat Regiment (March 1941 – May 1945)
 82nd Independent Light Bomber Company (1940–1942)
 21st Independent Headquarters Flight (July 1939-15 October 1942)
 Hokota Army Light Bomber Flying School
 Hokota Light Bomber Instructing Flight Division
 Mito Army Flying School
 Army Aviation Maintenance School
 Tokorozawa Army Aviation Maintenance School

Chinese Nationalist Air Force
6th Group
5th Squadron operated captured aircraft.

Chinese Communist Air Force operated captured aircraft. The last Ki-48 retired from training role in 1952.

Indonesian Air Force –then Indonesian People's Security Force– operated one aircraft against Dutch colonial rule. This aircraft was put together from bits and pieces of a number of aircraft to become the first twin-engined bomber in the Indonesian People's Security Force.

Survivors

There is a Ki-48 on display at the Museum of the Great Patriotic War, Moscow.
The China Aviation Museum in Datangshan has a Kawasaki Ki-48 in Chinese Liberation Army Air Force colours. Some of the parts of the airplane are reproduced.
The Indonesian Air Force Museum in Yogyakarta is also known to have a Ki-48 in its collection.

Specifications (Ki-48-IIa)

See also

Notes

Bibliography

 
  (new edition 1987 by Putnam Aeronautical Books, .)

 Jackson, Robert. The Encyclopedia of Military Aircraft. London: Parragon, 2002. .

External links

 Century of Flight
 Warbirds Resource Group

Ki-048
1940s Japanese bomber aircraft
Mid-wing aircraft
Aircraft first flown in 1940
Twin piston-engined tractor aircraft